In computability theory, the Rice–Shapiro theorem is a generalization of Rice's theorem, and is named after Henry Gordon Rice and Norman Shapiro.

Formal statement
Let A be a set of partial-recursive unary functions on the domain of natural numbers such that the set  is recursively enumerable, where  denotes the -th partial-recursive function in a Gödel numbering.

Then for any unary partial-recursive function , we have:

 a finite function   such that  

Perspective from effective topology
For any finite unary function  on integers,
let  denote the 'frustum'
on 's domain.

Equip the set of all partial-recursive functions with the topology generated by these
frusta as base. Note that for every frustum ,  is 
recursively enumerable. More generally it holds for every set 
of partial-recursive functions:

 is recursively enumerable   iff 
 is a recursively enumerable union of frusta.

Notes

References
; Theorem 7-2.16.

Theorems in the foundations of mathematics
Theorems in theory of computation